Laquidara is a surname. Notable people with the surname include:

Charles Laquidara (born 1938), American radio personality
Patrizia Laquidara (born 1972), Italian singer